The Mǎzōng Shān is a minor mountain range of Subei Mongol Autonomous County, Jiuquan, northern Gansu, China, between the Altay range to the north and the Qilian range to the south. The Mǎzōng Shān peak rises to 2584 m.

Climate 

Mount Mazong has a cold desert climate (Köppen climate classification BWk).

Gallery

References

See also
 Equijubus
 Xinminbao Group

Mountain ranges of China
Landforms of Gansu